Maharashtra Premier League (MPL) is an Indian Twenty20 cricket league established by the Maharashtra Cricket Association (MCA). This tournament is modelled after the popular Indian Premier League (IPL).

Auction 2017

2017 season 

In 2015, the Raigad Royals won the MPL, defeated the Pratapgad Warriors by 17 runs. Maharashtra batsman Chirag Khurana of Raigad Royals was named 'Man of the Series'.

Final

References 

Cricket leagues in India
Twenty20 cricket leagues